The 2011 Allen Wranglers season was the team's twelfth season as a professional indoor football franchise, second in the Indoor Football League (IFL), and the first as the "Allen Wranglers". The team played their home games at the Allen Event Center in the Dallas suburb of Allen, Texas.

The team finished with a 10-4 regular season and first place in the Lonestar Division. They advanced through two rounds of the IFL playoffs before losing the Intense Conference Championship to the Tri-Cities Fever.

Off-field moves
In October 2010, the team announced that Chris MacKeown would be the Wranglers' head coach for the 2011 season. MacKeown had most recently served as the offensive coordinator for the Arena Football League's Colorado Crush after a stint as head coach and director of football operations for the Amarillo Dusters of af2. During the 2011 season, MacKeown was suspended for one game due to a "verbal incident" with opposing coaches after a game in Amarillo on April 2, 2011.

Former Dallas Cowboys player Drew Pearson was named general manager of the franchise in early December 2010. John Harris, Vice President of Operations, organized a publicity stunt in February 2011, reporting the team's mascot "Hoss" had been kidnapped and asking fans and the Chick fil-a Cow to help solve the mystery by following clues on the team's Facebook page. The Allen Police Department cooperated by assigning Officer Garrett Courtney, who was also the team's kicker, as lead investigator.

In May 2011, with just over a month remaining in the regular season, the team announced a change in ownership groups.

Roster moves
Former West Texas A&M Buffaloes running back Keithon Flemming joined the Wranglers on May 25, 2011.

After the season, in late July 2011, Wranglers defensive end Keenan Mace signed with the Dallas Cowboys.

Schedule

Preseason

Regular season

** The IFL's Bricktown Brawlers based in Oklahoma City had collapsed financially and released all of their players late in the 2011 season. The North Texas Crunch of the Independent Indoor Football Alliance played as a replacement team to fill out the Brawlers' remaining scheduled games.

Playoffs

Standings

Final roster

References

External links
Allen Wranglers official website

Allen Wranglers
Arkansas Twisters seasons
Allen Wranglers